Tama Maru No. 2 was a  whaler built by Mitsubishi Jukogyo Kabushiki Kaisha, Kobe for Taiyo Hogei Kabushiki Kaisha in 1936. She was requisitioned in 1941 by the Imperial Japanese Navy during World War II and converted into a minesweeper.

On 13 March 1942, Tama Maru No. 2 sank as a result of damage inflicted off Lae.

Notes

External links
Chronological List of Japanese Merchant Vessel Losses

1936 ships
Mine warfare vessels of the Imperial Japanese Navy
Ships sunk by US aircraft
Minesweepers sunk by aircraft
Shipwrecks of Papua New Guinea
Maritime incidents in March 1942
World War II minesweepers of Japan
Auxiliary ships of the Imperial Japanese Navy